Mount Huntington is a mountain in the John Muir Wilderness north of Kings Canyon National Park. The mountain was named for Collis Potter Huntington, one of the builders of the Central Pacific Railroad.

Climate
According to the Köppen climate classification system, Mount Huntington is located in an alpine climate zone. Most weather fronts originate in the Pacific Ocean, and travel east toward the Sierra Nevada mountains. As fronts approach, they are forced upward by the peaks (orographic lift), causing them to drop their moisture in the form of rain or snowfall onto the range.

References 

Inyo National Forest
Sierra National Forest
Mountains of Mono County, California
Mountains of Fresno County, California
Mountains of the John Muir Wilderness
North American 3000 m summits
Mountains of Northern California
Sierra Nevada (United States)